The Choctaw (in the Choctaw language, Chahta) are a Native American people originally based in the Southeastern Woodlands, in what is now Alabama and Mississippi. Their Choctaw language is a Western Muskogean language. Today, Choctaw people are enrolled in three federally recognized tribes: the Choctaw Nation of Oklahoma, Mississippi Band of Choctaw Indians, and Jena Band of Choctaw Indians in Louisiana.

The Choctaw were first noted by Europeans in French written records of 1675. Their mother mound is Nanih Waiya, a great earthwork platform mound located in central-east Mississippi. Early Spanish explorers of the mid-16th century in the Southeast encountered ancestral Mississippian culture villages and chiefs.

The Choctaw coalesced as a people in the 17th century and developed at least three distinct political and geographical divisions: eastern, western, and southern. These different groups sometimes created distinct, independent alliances with nearby European powers. These included the French, based on the Gulf Coast and in Louisiana; the English of the Southeast, and the Spanish of Florida and Louisiana during the colonial era.

Most Choctaw allied with the Americans during American Revolution, War of 1812, and the Red Stick War, most notably at the Battle of New Orleans. European Americans considered the Choctaw to be one of the "Five Civilized Tribes" of the Southeast. The Choctaw and the United States agreed to a total of nine treaties. By the last three, the US gained vast land cessions in the Southeast. As part of Indian Removal, despite not having waged war against the United States, the majority of Choctaw were forcibly relocated to Indian Territory from 1831 to 1833. The Choctaw government in Indian Territory had three districts, each with its own chief, who together with the town chiefs sat on their National Council.

Those Choctaw who chose to stay in the state of Mississippi were considered state and U.S. citizens; they were one of the first major non-European ethnic groups to be granted citizenship. Article 14 in the 1830 treaty with the Choctaw stated Choctaws may wish to become citizens of the United States under the 14th Article of the Treaty of Dancing Rabbit Creek on all of the combined lands which were consolidated under Article I from all previous treaties between the United States and the Choctaw.

During the American Civil War, the Choctaw in both Indian Territory and Mississippi mostly sided with the Confederate States of America. Under the late 19th-century Dawes Act and Curtis Acts, the US federal government broke up tribal land holdings and dissolved tribal governments in Indian Territory in order to extinguish Indian land claims before admission of Oklahoma as a state in 1907. From that period, for several decades the US Bureau of Indian Affairs appointed chiefs of the Choctaw and other tribes in the former Indian Territory.

During World War I, Choctaw soldiers served in the US military as some of the first Native American codetalkers, using the Choctaw language. Since the Indian Reorganization Act of 1934, the Choctaw people in three areas have reconstituted their governments and gained federal recognition. The largest are the Choctaw Nation in Oklahoma.

Since the 20th century, the Mississippi Band of Choctaw Indians were federally recognized in 1945, the Choctaw Nation of Oklahoma in 1971, and the Jena Band of Choctaw Indians in 1995.

Etymology 
The Choctaw autonym is Chahta. Choctaw is an anglization of Chahta, whose meaning is unknown. The anthropologist John R. Swanton suggested that the Choctaw derived their name from an early leader. Henry Halbert, a historian, suggests that their name is derived from the Choctaw phrase Hacha hatak (river people).

History

Culture

The Choctaw people are believed to have coalesced in the 17th century, perhaps from peoples from Alabama and the Plaquemine culture. Their culture continued to evolve in the Southeast. The Choctaw practiced Head flattening as a ritual adornment for its people, but the practice eventually fell out of favor. Some of their communities had extensive trade and interaction with Europeans, including people from Spain, France, and England greatly shaped it as well. After the United States was formed and its settlers began to move into the Southeast, the Choctaw were among the Five Civilized Tribes, who adopted some of their ways. They transitioned to yeoman farming methods, and accepted European Americans and African Americans into their society. In mid-summer the Mississippi Band of Choctaw Indians celebrate their traditional culture during the Choctaw Indian Fair with ball games, dancing, cooking and entertainment.

Clans

Within the Choctaws were two distinct moieties: Imoklashas (elders) and Inhulalatas (youth). Each moiety had several clans or Iskas; it is estimated there were about 12 Iskas altogether. The people had a matrilineal kinship system, with children born into the clan or iska of the mother and taking their social status from it. In this system, their maternal uncles had important roles. Identity was established first by moiety and iska; so a Choctaw first identified as Imoklasha or Inhulata, and second as Choctaw. Children belonged to the Iska of their mother. The following were some major districts:

 Okla Hannalli (people of six towns)
 Okla Tannap (people from the other side)
 Okla Fayala (people who are widely dispersed)

By the early 1930s, the anthropologist John Swanton wrote of the Choctaw: "[T]here are only the faintest traces of groups with truly totemic designations, the animal and plant names which occur seeming not to have had a totemic connotation."
Swanton wrote, "Adam Hodgson ... told ... that there were tribes or families among the Indians, somewhat similar to the Scottish clans; such as, the Panther family, the Bird family, Raccoon Family, the Wolf family." The following are possible totemic clan designations:

 Wind
 Bear
 Deer
 Wolf
 Panther
 Holly Leaf
 Bird
 Raccoon
 Crawfish

Games

Choctaw stickball, the oldest field sport in North America, was also known as the "little brother of war" because of its roughness and substitution for war. When disputes arose between Choctaw communities, stickball provided a civil way to settle issues. The stickball games would involve as few as twenty or as many as 300 players. The goal posts could be from a few hundred feet apart to a few miles. Goal posts were sometimes located within each opposing team's village. A Jesuit priest referenced stickball in 1729, and George Catlin painted the subject. The Mississippi Band of Choctaw Indians continue to practice the sport.

Chunkey was a game using a stone-shaped disk that was about 1–2 inches in length.
Players would throw the disk down a  corridor so that it could roll past the players at great speed. As the disk rolled down the corridor, players would throw wooden shafts at it. The object of the game was to strike the disk or prevent your opponents from hitting it.

Other games included using corn, cane, and moccasins. The corn game used five to seven kernels of corn. One side was blackened and the other side white. Players won points based on each color. One point was awarded for the black side and 5–7 points for the white side. There were usually only two players.

Language

The Choctaw language is a member of the Muskogean family and was well known among the frontiersmen, such as Andrew Jackson and William Henry Harrison, of the early 19th century. The language is closely related to Chickasaw, and some linguists consider the two dialects a single language. The Choctaw language is the essence of tribal culture, tradition, and identity. Many Choctaw adults learned to speak the language before speaking English. The language is a part of daily life on the Mississippi Choctaw reservation. The following table is an example of Choctaw text and its translation:

Religion

The Choctaw believed in a good spirit and an evil spirit. They may have been sun, or Hushtahli, worshippers. The historian John Swanton wrote,

The word nanpisa (the one who sees) expressed the reverence the Choctaw had for the sun.

Choctaw prophets were known to have addressed the sun. John Swanton wrote, "an old Choctaw informed Wright that before the arrival of the missionaries, they had no conception of prayer. He added, "I have indeed heard it asserted by some, that anciently their hopaii, or prophets, on some occasions were accustomed to address the sun ..."

Traditional clothing

The colorful dresses worn by today's Choctaw are made by hand. They are based on designs of their ancestors, who adapted 19th-century European-American styles to their needs. Today many Choctaw wear such traditional clothing mainly for special events. Choctaw elders, especially the women, dress in their traditional garb every day. Choctaw dresses are trimmed by full diamond, half diamond or circle, and crosses that represent stickball sticks.

Communal economy
Early Choctaw communities worked communally and shared their harvest. They had trouble understanding why English settlers allowed their poor to suffer from hunger. In Ireland, the generosity of the Choctaw nation during their Great Famine in the mid-nineteenth century is remembered to this day and recently marked by a sculpture, 'Kindred Spirits', in a park at Midleton, Cork.

Treaties

Land was the most valuable asset, which the Native Americans held in collective stewardship. The United States systematically obtained Choctaw land for conventional European-American settlement through treaties, legislation, and threats of warfare. Although the Choctaw made treaties with Great Britain, France, Spain, and the Confederate States of America; the nation signed only nine treaties with the United States. Some treaties which the US made with other nations, such as the Treaty of San Lorenzo, indirectly affected the Choctaw.

Reservations
Reservations can be found in Louisiana (Jena Band of Choctaw Indians), Mississippi (Mississippi Band of Choctaw Indians), and Oklahoma (Choctaw Nation of Oklahoma). The Oklahoma reservation is defined by treaty. Other population centers can be found throughout the United States.

Influential leaders

 Tuscaloosa (died October 1540) retaliated against Hernando de Soto at the Battle of Mabilia. The battle was the first major conflict in North America between Native Americans and Europeans.
 Franchimastabe (died 19th century) was a transitional benefactor and a contemporary of Taboca. To some Americans he was the "leading chief of the Choctaws." He led a war party with British forces against American rebels. Franchasmatabe attended the treaty talks of 1801 near Mobile, Alabama.
 Taboca (died 19th century) was a traditional "prophet-chief" who led a delegation starting in October 1785 to Hopewell, South Carolina.
 Apuckshunubbee (–1824) was chief of the Okla Falaya (Tall People) district in old Choctaw nation. He died in Kentucky on his way to Washington D.C. to conduct negotiations.
 Pushmataha (Apushmataha) (1760s–December 24, 1824) was a chief in old Choctaw nation. He negotiated treaties with the United States and fought on the American's side in the War of 1812. He died in Washington D.C. and is buried in the Congressional Cemetery in Washington D.C.
 Mosholatubbee (1770–1836) was a chief in the Choctaw nation before the removal and after. He went to Washington City to negotiate for the tribe in 1824 and was the only major leader to return. In the summer of 1830, he ran for a seat in the Congress of the United States to represent the state of Mississippi.
 Greenwood LeFlore (June 3, 1800 – August 31, 1865) was a District Chief of the Choctaws in Mississippi. He was an influential state representative and senator in Mississippi.
 George W. Harkins (1810–1890) was a district Choctaw chief in Indian Territory (1850–1857) prior to the Civil War and author of the "Farewell Letter to the American People".
 Peter Pitchlynn (January 30, 1806 – January 17, 1881) was a highly influential leader during the removal era and long after. He represented the Choctaws in Washington D.C. for some years and is buried in the Congressional Cemetery. Charles Dickens described him "as stately and complete a gentleman of nature's making as ever I beheld."
 Wesley Johnson ( – 1925) was elected chief on May 10, 1913, in Meridian, Mississippi. He would lead the Mississippi, Alabama, and Louisiana Choctaw Council's delegation to Washington, D. C. in February 1914 where he met President Woodrow Wilson and many members of congress. There he expressed the dire situation of the Mississippi Choctaws. Wesley Johnson represented the Alabama Delegation from Southwest Alabama in Mobile and Washington Counties. Wesley Johnson was also known as Wesley Wakatubee.
 Phillip Martin (March 13, 1926 – February 4, 2010) was the Chief of the Mississippi Band of Choctaw Indians from 1979 to 2007 and worked in tribal government for over fifty years. He encouraged outside investment and reduced unemployment to nearly 0% on the reservation.

See also

 William Bartram
 Chato people
 Choctaw culture
 Choctaw mythology
 Choctaw Trail of Tears
 Cyrus Byington
 Gideon Lincecum
 Steven Charleston
 List of Choctaw Treaties
 List of sites and peoples visited by the Hernando de Soto Expedition
 okay ("okeh", etymology)
 Bulbancha

References

Bibliography 

 Patricia Galloway and Clara Sue Kidwell. "Choctaw in the East." In Handbook of North American Indians: Vol. 14, Southeast. Raymond D. Fogelson, volume editor. Washington, DC: Smithsonian Institution, 2004: 499–519.
 
 Akers, Donna L. Living in the Land of Death: The Choctaw Nation, 1830–1860, Lansing: Michigan State University, 2004.
 Barnett Jr., James F. Mississippi's American Indians. Jackson, MS: University Press of Mississippi, 2012.
 Bartram, William. Travels Through...Country of the Chactaws..., Florida: printed by James & Johnson, 1791.
 
 Bushnell, David I. Smithsonian Institution Bureau of American Ethnology Bulletin 48: The Choctaw of Bayou Lacomb, St. Tammany Parish, Louisiana. Washington, DC: Government Printing Office, 1909.
 Byington, Cyrus. Smithsonian Institution Bureau of American Ethnology Bulletin 46: A Dictionary of the Choctaw Language. Washington, DC: Government Printing Office, 1915.
 Carson, James Taylor. Searching for the Bright Path: The Mississippi Choctaws from Prehistory to Removal. Lincoln: University of Nebraska Press, 1999.
 
 
 Haag, Marcia and Henry Willis. Choctaw Language & Culture: Chahta Anumpa. Norman, OK: University of Oklahoma Press, 2001.
 Hurley, Patrick J.(1883). National Atty. for Choctaw Nation "Choctaw Citizenship Litigation.
 Jimmie, Randy and Jimmie, Leonard. NANIH WAIYA Magazine, 1974, Vol I, Number 3.
 Kidwell, Clara Sue. Choctaws and Missionaries in Mississippi, 1818–1918. University of Oklahoma Press: Norman and London, 1995.
 Kidwell, Clara Sue. The Choctaws in Oklahoma: From Tribe to Nation, 1855–1970 2007.
 Lambert, Valerie. Choctaw Nation: A Story of American Indian Resurgence. U. of Nebraska Press, 2007.
 Lincecum, Gideon. Pushmataha: A Choctaw Leader and His People. Tuscaloosa: University of Alabama Press, 2004.
 Lincecum, Gideon. Traditional History of the Chahta Nation, Translated from the Chahta by Gideon Lincecum, 1861. University of Texas Library, March 1932.
 
 
 
 O'Brien, Greg. Choctaws in a Revolutionary Age, 1750–1830. Lincoln: University of Nebraska Press, 2002.
 O'Brien, Greg, ed. Pre-removal Choctaw History: Exploring New Paths. Norman, OK: University of Oklahoma Press, 2008.
 O'Brien, Greg. "Mushulatubbee and Choctaw Removal: Chiefs Confront a Changing World." 2001.
 O'Brien, Greg. "Pushmataha: Choctaw Warrior, Diplomat, and Chief." 2001.
 Pesantubbee, Michelene E. Choctaw Women in a Chaotic World: The Clash of Cultures in the Colonial Southeast. Albuquerque, NM: University of New Mexico, 2005.
 
 
 Wells, Samuel J., and Tubby, Roseanna (Editors). After Removal, The Choctaw in Mississippi. Jackson and London: University Press of Mississippi, 1986. .
 
 Mississippi Choctaw Reservation and Off-Reservation Trust Land, Mississippi United States Census Bureau

External links

Choctaw governments 
 Choctaw Nation of Oklahoma (official site)
 Jena Band of Choctaw Indians (official site)
 Mississippi Band of Choctaw Indians (official site)

History and culture 
 Choctaw Indian Fair
 "Choctaws" by Dr. D.L. Birchfield
 
 Choctaw, Oklahoma Historical Society
 J. L. Hargett Collection of Choctaw Nation Papers. Yale Collection of Western Americana, Beinecke Rare Book and Manuscript Library.

 
Native American history of Alabama
Native American tribes in Louisiana
Native American tribes in Mississippi
Native American tribes in Oklahoma
South Appalachian Mississippian culture
Indigenous peoples of the Southeastern Woodlands
Native Americans in the American Revolution